Palokka-Puuppola is a ward of Jyväskylä, Finland. It is located north from the city centre on both sides of European route E75 road. There are many lakes on the area biggest of them being Palokkajärvi and Alvajärvi As of November 2010 the population of Palokka-Puuppola was 14,395.

The Palokka-Puuppola ward is divided into 12 different districts.

Population of neighbourhoods of Palokka-Puuppola in 2007
 41. Palokka
 42. Mannisenmäki
 43. Rippalanmäki
 44. Haukkamäki (2,386)
 45. Kirri, (population 958)
 46. Heikkilä (2,330)
 47. Pappilanvuori (2,476)
 49. Hiekkapohja (200)
 50. Matinmäki
 51. Jylhänperä
 52. Puuppola (1,338)
 53. Saarenmaa (935)
 57. Vertaala

Source

References

External links

Neighbourhoods of Jyväskylä